Kitto is a surname. Notable people with the surname include:

 Ernest Kitto (1871–1897), Scottish cricketer
 Frank Kitto (1903–1994), Australian high court justice
 H. D. F. Kitto (1897–1982), British classical Greek scholar
 John Kitto (1804–1854), British Bible scholar
John Fenwick Kitto (1837–1903), English Anglican clergyman
 Stanislav Kitto (born 1972), Estonian professional footballer

See also
 Kitto Line, Japanese railway line